Jehunwadi is a village in the Karmala taluka of Solapur district in Maharashtra state, India.

Demographics
Covering  and comprising 190 households at the time of the 2011 census of India, Jehunwadi had a population of 909. There were 465 males and 444 females, with 121 people being aged six or younger.

References

Villages in Karmala taluka